The 1986–87 Temple Owls men's basketball team represented Temple University as a member of the Atlantic 10 Conference during the 1986–87 NCAA Division I men's basketball season.

Roster

Schedule and results

|-
!colspan=12 style=| Regular season

|-
!colspan=12 style=| Atlantic 10 Tournament

|-
!colspan=12 style=| NCAA Tournament

Rankings

Awards and honors
Nate Blackwell – Atlantic 10 Player of the Year, First-team All-Atlantic 10
John Chaney – USBWA National Coach of the Year, Atlantic 10 Coach of the Year

References

Temple Owls men's basketball seasons
Temple
Temple
Temple
Temple